Taffy and the Jungle Hunter is a 1965 American adventure film directed by Terry O. Morse and written by Arthur Hoerl and Al Zimbalist. The film stars Jacques Bergerac, Manuel Padilla Jr., Shary Marshall and Hari Rhodes. The film was released on March 31, 1965, by Allied Artists Pictures.

Plot

Cast          
Jacques Bergerac as David Claveau
Manuel Padilla Jr. as Beau
Shary Marshall as Rosa Wynn
Hari Rhodes as Kahli 
Robert DoQui

References

External links
 

1965 films
American adventure films
1960s adventure films
Allied Artists films
Films directed by Terry O. Morse
1960s English-language films
1960s American films